is a series of role-playing video games created by Yoshitaka Murayama. Each individual game centers on themes of politics, corruption, revolution, mystical crystals known as True Runes, and the "108 Stars of Destiny"—the 108 protagonists who are loosely interpreted from the source material.

Although the events of the games are not chronological, the entire series (except for Tierkreis and Tsumugareshi Hyakunen no Toki) takes place within the same world, among continuing and overlapping histories. In some cases, several characters appear in multiple installments.

A spiritual successor entitled Eiyuden Chronicle: Hundred Heroes, made by the original Suikoden team, is set to release in 2023.

Games 
The franchise began in 1995. The first two games were primarily 2D, using 3D graphics only for environments and visual effects. Suikoden III however marked the series' complete shift from 2D to 3D as the series made its way to the PlayStation 2.

The series comprises the following titles including prequels, sequels and spin-offs from the main series. They are arranged chronologically with their release dates:

Main series

Spin-offs

Re-releases

Gensō Suikoden I & II
 is a re-release of Suikoden and Suikoden II for the PlayStation Portable. Konami announced the game in the fourth quarter of 2005, and the compilation was released on February 23, 2006. Both games are combined in one Universal Media Disc (UMD), in which the player can choose which Suikoden game they want to play, as well as a third choice which is "Gallery" (ギャラリー).

Several changes from the original PlayStation versions of Suikoden and II were done for the PSP. The player is now able to move their character diagonally inside places and over the world map. Graphics have been slightly enhanced and redone to fit widescreen. This includes an extension of some places which were designed for PAL and NTSC televisions.

The art director of the Suikoden series discussed in his blog a possible overseas release. However, the possibility was subsequently dismissed as a mistranslation and the blog has since disappeared. The game has not been translated.

Gensō Suikoden I & II sold 21,707 copies in Japan, considered low based on the critical reception of the original games.

Suikoden I and II HD Remaster: Gate Rune and Dunan Unification Wars 
A remastered version of the first two entries, Suikoden I and II HD Remaster: Gate Rune and Dunan Unification Wars, is scheduled for release on Nintendo Switch, PlayStation 4, Windows, and Xbox One in 2023. It includes graphical improvements such as enhanced backgrounds and redrawn portraits, new and enhanced sound effects, Mode 7-style world map system, and quality of life features such as a fast-forward toggle for battles.

Elements

Gameplay 
In the Suikoden series, the player takes control of a battle party having a maximum of six people (consisting of the protagonist and 5 other characters), Suikoden IV, however, reduces the party to four fighters and one support. The goal of the game is for the protagonist to defeat the opponents who are trying to oppose his/her team. This becomes possible as every game in the series revolves around the recruitment of the 108 Stars of Destiny; wherein the fighter characters recruited from the bunch can be used as members for the battle party; every games in the series haves their respective Stars of Destiny. The series practically makes use of running around towns on different islands and into dungeons filled with monsters or enemies. A base or headquarters will also be obtained by the player which is usually abandoned, monster-infested castles which turns into bustling communities when captured.

Battle modes 
The most typical form of battle in the series is the turn-based battle wherein the 6-man team faces the opponents. However, it is not the sole form of battle featured in the games. There are 3 different types of battle present which recurs and have been accustomed to every game. They are: 'Basic Battle', 'One-on-one Duel' and 'Strategic War Battle'.

 Basic Battle: It is the most common form of battle. It is when the protagonist's 6-man team will have to battle out. This mode allows the player to control the 6 party members with different commands such as the 'Fight' where the player designates the action he/she wants the characters to perform, 'Run' to escape, 'Bribe' to use the party's money called Potch to bribe the enemy for escape and the 'Auto' command in which the game automatically designates the 'Attack' command for every character.
 One-on-one Duel: A battle where only a single character fights and happens only in special events. It is a turn-based duel in which the player chooses command to attack (instead of manually controlled fighting). Duels in the series is typically not time-based except Suikoden V wherein choosing a command is timed for 3 seconds. Duels are usually accompanied by dialogue exchange between the player and the enemy, with the dialogue giving clues to what command the enemy will choose next (Essentially rock, paper scissors with the enemy commentary telling the player which they chose).
 Strategic War Battle: A turn-based strategic battle between the protagonist's side and the enemy. In more accurate terms, this is a battle between armies of the protagonist and the enemy. The protagonist's army is made up of many units which could be organized by the player however he/she desires. Every game in the series has different forms of war battles most notably in Suikoden IV, where the battles are done in the sea. Suikoden V however, is the first game to make use of real-time strategy.

Development 
The Suikoden series was created, written, produced, and overseen by Yoshitaka Murayama, who left Konami near the end of Suikoden III'''s development. Noritada Matsukawa took over as Senior Director of Suikoden III following Murayama's departure. Suikoden IV was directed by Matsukawa as well but was produced by Junko Kawano, who was the chief designer in Suikoden I. Suikoden V was directed by Takahiro Sakiyama, a relative newcomer to RPGs.

 Future 
In an interview conducted by Japanese website 4gamers.net regarding the RPG Frontier Gate, Konami developers revealed that the Suikoden development team has been disbanded with members scattered about teams within Konami and elsewhere. This led to speculation that the franchise had indeed been abandoned following disappointing sales of the latest entries in the series.

Despite these rumours, Konami presented a trailer for a new Suikoden game on Tokyo Game Show 2011: Genso Suikoden: The Woven Web of a Century (Genso Suikoden Tsumugareshi Hyakunen no Toki). It came out in Japan for PSP on 12 February 2012 to generally lackluster reviews.

According to an article published by The Nikkei in 2015, development on the series has been halted.

In 2020, one of Suikodens development crew left Konami and named a new studio called Rabbit & Bear, founded by some of the key creative minds behind the classic PlayStation-era roleplaying series, including Yoshitaka Murayama, director and writer on the first two Suikoden games, and the creative team also includes Junko Kawano, the lead artist on Suikoden 1 and 4; Junichi Murakami, art director on Castlevania: Aria of Sorrow; Suikoden Tactics director Osamu Komuta; and composers Motoi Sakuraba and Michiko Naruke. Murayama directed to a Suikoden follow-up game called Eiyuden Chronicle: Hundred Heroes, slated to release worldwide on 2023.

 World, setting, and concepts 
Essentially, each game follows the plot formula of a coup d'état by corrupt power holder(s) and the protagonist is an exile from his/her home. The plot also follows the disastrous misuse of the "True Runes" while the hero struggles, despite overwhelming odds, to bring peace to the land alongside his/her friends, and the climactic showdown with the corrupted True Rune incarnation.

 The 27 True Runes 
The 27 True Runes are powerful sources of all magic and primal forces in the world of Suikoden. Wholly sentient and possessing their own will, the True Runes hold immeasurable power, and are the equivalents of gods in the Suikoden world. Many wars have been fought over them in the past, some instigated by the will of the runes themselves. True Runes are often sought by the powerful and influential due to their shared property of granting immortality to those who will bear them. All bearers of True Runes stop aging and become immune to disease and all other natural causes of death, though they can still die from physical trauma such as accidents or murder.

The True Runes often attach themselves to living beings. Doing so gives the True Rune holder great power over the aspect of nature the Rune governs, as well as immortality so long as they bear the Rune. Bearing a True Rune can also have negative consequences, as in the case of the bearer of the Moon Rune being transformed into a vampire. A True Rune can also take the shape of a physical object, as is the case with the Star Dragon Sword being a manifestation of the Night Rune. They can also incarnate themselves unattached from a host, as the Beast Rune did during the Highland-Jowston conflict, self-activating and then feeding of its own will.Origin of True Runes and the Creation of the Suikoden UniverseThe story of the creation of the Suikoden universe can be found in books discovered in most games. The story from "Old Book Vol.1" from Suikoden I reads:Known True Runes'Gate RuneGoverns the connection between worlds
Split between the Front and Back halves; Front Gate Rune formerly held by Windy, the Back Gate Rune held by Leknaat (Suikoden I, II, III, IV, V)
The Blue/Pale Gate Rune is derived from this rune
Rune of Life and Death (also known as the Soul Eater)
Represents life and death, and grants the bearer power over them
Considered a cursed rune, it steers the fates of those near the rune bearer to their deaths
Held by Ted, Ted's grandfather, and the first Hero (Suikoden I, II, and IV)
The Darkness rune is derived from this rune
Rune of the Beginning 
Represents the conflict between the brothers "Sword" and "Shield" at the creation of the Suikoden universe; governs war and conflict
Almost always exists split into two aspects: the Bright Shield Rune and Black Sword Rune, and the bearers of each rune are destined to fight each other (Suikoden II)
Held by Genkaku and Han Cunningham during the first Highland-Jowston conflict, later held by the second Hero and Jowy (Suikoden II)
The Shield rune is derived from the Bright Shield Rune
Rune of Punishment 
Governs atonement and forgiveness
Considered a cursed rune, use of its power drains the rune bearer of life force, and bearers of the rune tend to have short lives
Held by the Queen of Obel, Graham Cray and his son, Rakgi's father, Steele, Brandeau, Glen Cott, and the Hero (Suikoden IV)
True Elemental Runes (Fire, Water, Earth, Wind, and Lightning)
Govern the five fundamental elements of the Suikoden universe; each rune grants the bearer great power over that element
All elemental runes are derived from these True Runes
True Fire Rune - held by the Flame Champion, and later either Hugo, Chris Lightfellow, or Geddoe (Suikoden III)
True Water Rune - held by Wyatt Lightfellow, and later either Chris Lightfellow or Hugo (Suikoden III)
True Earth Rune - held by Bishop Sasarai of Harmonia (Suikoden II and III)
True Wind Rune - held by Luc (Suikoden II and III)
True Lightning Rune - held by Geddoe or Hugo (Suikoden III)
Sun Rune
Governs the power of light
While the rune can be borne by a person, it drives its bearer insane and is typically kept sealed away
Two child runes, the Twilight Rune and Dawn Rune, were created from the separation of the Sun Rune and the Night Rune and govern the Sun Rune's power
A treasure of the Queendom of Falena, the Sun Rune was formerly held by Queen Arshtat Falenas
The Dawn Rune is held by the Prince, and the Twilight Rune is held by Alenia, Sialeeds, and Lyon (Suikoden V)
Sovereign Rune
Represents authority and the power to rule; grants bearer immunity from all other runes
Held by Emperor Barbarossa of the Scarlet Moon Empire (Suikoden I)
Hachifusa (Eight-Fold) Rune
Held by Yuber (never featured in a game; Yuber's Eight-Devil Rune in Suikoden III is assumed to be related to it)
Circle Rune 
Represents order, harmony, and stagnation
Held by Harmonia's leader, High Priest Hikusaak (never featured in a game)
Rune of Change
Governs change
Speculated to be held by the leader of the ancient nomadic Sindar people (never featured in a game)
Moon Rune 
Represents compassion and destruction
Transforms the rune bearer into a vampire
Held by Neclord, and then Sierra Mikain (Suikoden I, II)
Night Rune 
Represents night and darkness, and is the opposite of the Sun Rune; originally born joined with the Sun Rune, it but it took the form of a sword and separated itself
Incarnated as the Star Dragon Sword (Zodiac Sword), which is wielded by Viktor during Suikoden I and II, and Edge in Suikoden III
Grants the wielder the power over "creatures of the night" such as vampires
Its child rune, the Star Rune, is held by Zerase (Suikoden V) 
Beast Rune
Represents rage, passion, and bloodlust
Sealed in the capital of Highland, L'Renouille Palace (Suikoden II)
Dragon Rune
Governs dragons, and is the source of dragons in the Suikoden universe
Grants the bearer the ability to command dragons
Held by Joshua Levenheit, and later Milia, as leaders of the Dragon Knights

The 108 Stars of Destiny 

A concept borrowed from the Chinese novel Shui Hu Zhuan, each Suikoden game has featured 108 characters who band together to ward off a threat. In each main Suikoden game (excluding the Suikogaiden games and Suikoden Tactics), there are 108 notable characters, all of which are recruitable except for in Suikoden III, where several of the stars of destiny were the antagonist characters. While recruiting all of the Stars of Destiny is not a requirement to finishing the game, recruiting all of them gives certain bonuses that affect the story of the game.

Geography 
The Suikoden series is set in a world with many countries. The political geography has changed over the series chronology; while the most recent game in the setting is Suikoden V, chronologically, Suikoden IV is the earliest game while Suikoden III occurs latest within the time span of the series.

Suikoden, Suikoden II and Suikoden III are set on the Northern Continent, a land mass composed of several regions. Suikoden takes place in the Scarlet Moon Empire, which is located on southeastern coast of the Northern Continent, and is composed primarily of the Toran region, with Lake Toran at its centre. Notable locations in this area include Gregminister, the empire's capital situated in Arlus, the Warrior's Village in the Lorimar region, and the Great Forest. At the end of Suikoden, the empire is replaced by the Toran Republic.

Suikoden II is set in the Dunan region, north-west of the Toran Republic, and initially comprises the Highland Kingdom in the east and the Jowston City-States, a confederation of politically autonomous states, in the west. Significant locations in Jowston include the cities-states of South Window, Greenhill, Muse, and Two River, and the Knightdom of Matilda. Following the Dunan Unification War, the Highland Kingdom falls and it, along with the Jowston City-States unite to form the Dunan Republic. The Tinto region lying in the west, separated from Dunan by mountains, chooses to remain politically independent and becomes the Tinto Republic.

Sharing Dunan's western border and north of Tinto are the Grasslands, which stretch from the centre of the Northern Continent to a small portion of the continent's west coast. The area is composed of the six clans: the Lizard, Duck, Karaya, Chisha, Safir, and the Alma Kinan. Directly west of the Grasslands and bordered in the east by Tinto is the Zexen Confederacy, located on the west coast of the Northern Continent and historically an offshoot of the Grasslands. Important locations include the Zexen capital Vinay del Zexay and Budehuc Castle, which lies close to the Grasslands border in northwest Zexen. The primary conflict of Suikoden III occurs in these areas. The northwestern portion of the continent, due north of the Grasslands and Zexen, is the Knightdom of Camaro and the surrounding Nameless Lands.

The largest country in the north is the Holy Kingdom of Harmonia, located in the northeastern portion of the continent. Since its establishment, it has assimilated various neighbouring countries, such as Sanadia, as well as a portion of the Grasslands – the Kanaa clan of the Grasslands became Le Buque under Harmonian rule after the First Fire Bringer War. Notably, the Scarlet Moon Empire originally formed after obtaining political autonomy from Harmonia and taking Harmonia's old capital as its own, renaming it Gregminister, resulting in Harmonia establishing a new capital at the Crystal Valley. Harmonia is also home to the Tower, a location reserved for training and housing members of the Howling Voice Guild.

Other major areas on the Northern Continent include the Kooluk region and Kanakan. The Kooluk region was originally the Kooluk Empire during the course of Suikoden IV and eventually dissolved in Suikoden Tactics to be left as a group of independent settlements. It takes up most of the southern edge of the Northern continent and directly borders the Toran Republic in the east and the Dunan Republic in the north. Off the eastern coast of Toran is the island of Kanakan.

Lying directly south of the Northern Continent is the ocean and several islands, including Obel, Middleport, and Razril. At the end of Suikoden IV, most of these islands are unified to become the Island Nations Federation. The largest island in the area, the Dukedom of Gaien, remains independent. West of Gaien is the island nation of the Kingdom of Zelant.

Due south of the Island Nations is the Southern Continent, a landmass composed primarily of three countries: the Queendom of Falena, and its neighbours, the theocracy of Nagarea in the southwest and the New Armes Kingdom in the southeast. As the setting for Suikoden V, Falena has a large network of rivers and lakes throughout the country and the Ashtwal Mountains in its northern region. Key locations include the cities of Stormfist and Doraat in the west; Rainwall, Estrise, and Sable, located on the Armes border, in the east; Lelcar, Lordlake, and Sauronix in the south; and the Falenan capital, Sol-Falena, and the holy land of Lunas, governed by the Oracle, in the north. Falena has been protected from the militant theocracy Nagarea since the mountain pass between the nations was destroyed, though Armes continues to remain a threat throughout Suikoden V.

Northeast of Falena also appears portion of a landmass of considerable size. West of the Northern and Southern Continents and the Island Nations is a landmass referred to as the Western Continent, of which few details are known. Scattered across the world are mysterious ruins attributed to the lost Sindar race, which is a recurring theme throughout the Suikoden series.

Music collections 
The Suikoden games have generally been considered to have soundtracks very well liked by the gaming community, though they have only been released in Japan as of 2007. 

A series of arranged soundtracks were released from late 2001–2004. Despite the first being released slightly before Suikoden III and the last at around the same time as Suikoden IV, the music was always taken from music in Suikoden, Suikoden II, Suikoden III, and (rarely) the Suikogaiden side-stories.

 Genso Suikoden Music Collection Produced by Hiroyuki Nanba — a 10-track arrangement released on 29 December 2001. The production and arrangement were both done by Hiroyuki Namba, as the name indicates.
 Genso Suikoden Music Collection Produced by Kentaro Haneda — another 10-track arrangement released on 24 April 2002. Kentarō Haneda was only the producer; the arrangements were done by Kousuke Yamashita, Michiru Oshima, Rie Akagi, Kenji Yamamoto, and Hiroshi Takagi.
 Genso Suikoden Vocal Collection ~La passione commuove la storia~ — a 10-track arrangement released on 3 July 2002. The first piece is an instrumental, but the other tracks all feature vocals. The arrangement was done by Kousuke Yamashita, Hiroshi Takagi, and Megumi Ohashi. Performers included Yuko Imai, Risa Oki, and Yoko Ueno.
 Genso Suikoden Vocal Collection ~Distant Stars, Echoes of Love~ — a 10-track arrangement released on 22 January 2003. The arrangement was once more done by Kousuke Yamashita, Hiroshi Takagi, and Megumi Ohashi. Performers included Sanae Shintani, Yuko Imai, and Tomoko.
 Genso Suikoden Piano Collection ~Avertunerio Antes Lance Mao~ — a 13-track arrangement released on 18 December 2002, arranged by Shusei Murai. Despite the name, these are not piano solos; most include orchestral backup, and some have vocals as well.
 Genso Suikoden Celtic Collection — a 12 track arrangement in the style of celtic music released on 5 March 2003. The arrangements were done by Yoko Ueno, Mina Kubota, Yuko Asai, Shigeyoshi Kawagoe, and "The Rain Book."
 Genso Suikoden Celtic Collection 2 — a 12-track arrangement released on 20 August 2003. Arrangement was done by Yoko Ueno, Yuji Yoshino, Yuko Asai, and Shigeyoshi Kawagoe.
 Genso Suikoden Music Collection ~Asian Collection~ — a 12-track arrangement released on 27 November 2003. It was arranged by Kiyoshi Yoshida, Hidenori Maezawa, Yuko Asai, and Shigeyoshi Kawagoe.
 Genso Suikoden Piano Collection 2 — a 12 track arrangement released on 21 January 2004, arranged by Shusei Murai.
 Genso Suikoden Celtic Collection III — a 13 track arrangement released on 14 April 2004, arranged by Yuji Yoshino.

Publications, adaptations, and other material 
Many publications, such as the Suikoden World Guide and Suikoden Encyclopedia, exist for the Suikoden series, though the majority are only in Japanese. Suikoden and Suikoden II have light novel adaptations written by Shinjiro Hori released only in Japan. Suikoden III was adapted into a manga by Aki Shimizu, which was released in English markets by Tokyopop.

Cameos 
Tokimeki Memorial: Forever with You (1995) (PlayStation, Sega Saturn, PlayStation Portable)

Mitsumete Knight R (1998) (PlayStation)
The protagonist of Suikoden I is one of the characters in this game.

Konami Wai Wai Sokoban (2006) (mobile phones)
The protagonist of Suikoden I is one of the selectable characters in this game.

Professional Yakyuu Spirits A (2015) (mobile phones)
Tir appear as supportive character.

Super Bomberman R Online (2021)

References

External links 
 Official Genso Suikoden site from Konami 

 
Konami franchises
Tokyopop titles
Works based on Water Margin
Video game franchises introduced in 1995
Video games based on Chinese mythology